Chinese protests may refer to the following protests:

Boxer Rebellion
Xinhai revolution
May 4th movement
Tiananmen Square protests (disambiguation)
1989 Tiananmen Square protests and massacre
2005 anti-Japanese demonstrations
2008 Tibetan unrest
1025 rally to safeguard Taiwan
Nanjing anti-African protests
Dongzhou protests
2010 Chinese labour unrest
Any of the protests in China in 2011
2022 COVID-19 protests in China